The Atlanta Braves are a Major League Baseball franchise based in Atlanta. They play in the National League East division. Also known in their early years as the "Boston Red Caps" (1876–1882), "Boston Beaneaters" (1883–1906), "Boston Doves" (1907–1910), "Boston Rustlers" (1911), "Boston Bees" (1936–1940), "Boston Braves" (1912–1935, 1941–1952), and "Milwaukee Braves" (1953–1965), pitchers for the Braves have thrown 14 no-hitters in franchise history.

A no-hitter is officially recognized by Major League Baseball only "when a pitcher (or pitchers) allows no hits during the entire course of a game, which consists of at least nine innings", though one or more batters "may reach base via a walk, an error, a hit by pitch, a passed ball or wild pitch on strike three, or catcher's interference". No-hitters of less than nine complete innings were previously recognized by the league as official; however, several rule alterations in 1991 changed the rule to its current form.

A perfect game, a special subcategory of no-hitter, has yet to be thrown in Braves history. As defined by Major League Baseball, "in a perfect game, no batter reaches any base during the course of the game."

History
Jack Stivetts threw the first no-hitter in Braves history on August 6, 1892; the most recent no-hitter was thrown by Kent Mercker on April 8, 1994. Two left-handed pitchers have thrown no-hitters in franchise history while eleven were by right-handers. Twelve no-hitters were thrown at home and only two on the road. They threw three in April, one in May, two in June, five in August, and three in September. The longest interval between no-hitters was between the games pitched by Tom Hughes and Jim Tobin, encompassing 27 years, 10 months, and 20 days from June 16, 1916 till April 27, 1944. Conversely, the shortest interval between no-hitters was between the games pitched by Lew Burdette and Warren Spahn, encompassing merely 29 days from August 18, 1960 till September 16, 1960.

The Braves have no-hit the Philadelphia Phillies the most, which occurred four times, which were no-hit by George Davis in 1914, Jim Wilson in 1954, Burdette in 1960, and Spahn in 1960. There is one no-hitter which the team allowed one run, thrown by Vic Willis in 1899. The most baserunners allowed in a no-hitter was by Hughes (in 1916), who allowed seven. Of the fourteen no-hitters, three have been won by a score of 1–0, 2–0, and 7–0, more common than any other results. The largest margin of victory in a no-hitter was an 11–0 win by Stivetts in 1892. The smallest margin of victory in a no-hitter was a 1–0 wins by Burdette in 1960, Spahn in 1961, and a combined no-hitter by Kent Mercker, Mark Wohlers, and Alejandro Peña in 1991.

The Braves are the only team to claim three straight no-hitters with no other teams throwing one between: the Burdette and Spahn no-hitters in 1960, followed by Spahn's second no-hitter in 1961.

Umpire
The umpire is part of any no-hitter. The task of the umpire in a baseball game is to make any decision "which involves judgment, such as, but not limited to, whether a batted ball is fair or foul, whether a pitch is a strike or a ball, or whether a runner is safe or out… [the umpire's judgment on such matters] is final." Part of the duties of the umpire making calls at home plate includes defining the strike zone, which "is defined as that area over homeplate (sic) the upper limit of which is a horizontal line at the midpoint between the top of the shoulders and the top of the uniform pants, and the lower level is a line at the hollow beneath the kneecap." These calls define every baseball game and are therefore integral to the completion of any no-hitter. 12 different umpires presided over each of the franchise's 14 no-hitters.

Manager
The manager is another integral part of any no-hitter. The tasks of the manager include determining the starting rotation as well as batting order and defensive lineup every game. Managers choosing the right pitcher and right defensive lineup at a right game at a right place at a right time would contribute to a no-hitter. 10 different managers, most recently Bobby Cox, have led the franchise during the team's 14 no-hitters.

List of no-hitters in Braves history

See also
List of Major League Baseball no-hitters

References

External links
Braves Rare Feats: No-hitters at Atlanta Braves official site

No-hitters
Atlanta Braves